De Gans (English: The Goose) is a smock mill in Ezumazijl, Friesland, Netherlands which has been restored to working order. The mill is listed as a Rijksmonument, number 31571.

History

De Gans was built  in 1850 by farmer Martinus Aukes Wierda who owned the Guozzepôle farm. The mill drained the Ganzenpolder. It drained  of land, depositing the drainage water into the Zuider Ee.

By 1962, it was uneconomic to work the mill and it was replaced by an electric motor. It had been sold to the local authority by 1965. In 1970, the mill was restored by millwright De Roos of Leeuwarden. During this restoration the Patent sails were replaced with Common sails. The mill retained its wooden windshaft after this restoration. In 1988, the mill was again restored, this time by Thijs Jellema of Birdaard. A new cast-iron windshaft was fitted. The old wooden windshaft is preserved in De Zwaluw, Birdaard. De Gans is the sole survivor of six windmills which formerly drained the Ganzenpolder.

Description

De Gans is what the Dutch describe as an achtkante grondzeiler - a smock mill whose  sails reach almost to the ground. It is a two-storey smock mill on a single-storey base. The mill is winded by tailpole and winch. The smock is covered in vertical wooden boards. The sails are Common sails. The sails are carried on a cast-iron windshaft. The windshaft also carries the brake wheel which has 32 cogs. This drives the wallower (18 cogs) at  the top of the upright shaft. At the bottom of the upright shaft, the crown wheel, which has 28 cogs drives a gearwheel with 26 cogs on the axle of the Archimedes' screw. The screw is inclined at 24°. Each revolution of the screw lifts  of water.

References

Windmills in Friesland
Windmills completed in 1850
Smock mills in the Netherlands
Windpumps in the Netherlands
Rijksmonuments in Friesland
Octagonal buildings in the Netherlands